The 2022–23 season is the 93rd season in the history of Girona FC and their first season back in the top flight since 2019. The club are participating in La Liga and the Copa del Rey.

Players

First-team squad

Transfers

In

Out

Pre-season and friendlies

Competitions

Overall record

La Liga

League table

Results summary

Results by round

Matches 
The league fixtures were announced on 23 June 2022.

Copa del Rey

References

Girona FC seasons
Girona